Cataldo may refer to:

 Cataldo (name), given name and a surname
 Cataldo, Idaho, unincorporated community in Idaho, United States
 Cataldo Mission, National Historic Landmark in Cataldo, Idaho
 Cataldo 'ndrina, clan of the 'Ndrangheta, a criminal and mafia-type organisation in Calabria, Italy
 Cataldo Ambulance Service, ambulance services in the Greater Boston and North Shore areas in the U.S. Commonwealth of Massachusetts

See also 

 Catald
 Cataldi
 San Cataldo (disambiguation)